François Hilarion Paul Olivari, stage name Paul Ollivier (10 February 1876 - 10 June 1948) was a French film actor.

Selected filmography
 The Phantom of the Moulin Rouge (1925)
 The Queen of Moulin Rouge (1926)
 The Imaginary Voyage (1926)
 Captain Rascasse (1927)
 The Italian Straw Hat (1928)
 The Unknown Dancer (1929)
 The Crime of Sylvestre Bonnard (1929)
 Under the Roofs of Paris (1930)
 Congress Dances (1931)
 À Nous la Liberté (1931)
 About an Inquest (1931)
 Le Million (1931)
 Captain Craddock (1931)
 The Triangle of Fire (1932)
 The Beautiful Adventure (1932)
 Court Waltzes (1933)
 Bastille Day (1933)
 The Last Billionaire (1934)
 Merchant of Love (1935)
 The Lie of Nina Petrovna (1937)
 Gargousse (1938)
 Bolero (1942)

References

External links

1876 births
1948 deaths
French male film actors
French male silent film actors
20th-century French male actors
Male actors from Marseille